Chaika is an Australian band. Originally formed as Di Khupe Heybners they play a mix of styles including folk, jazz, chamber music and they sing in Italian, Russian, Bulgarian, Hebrew, Romanie and English.

Their third album, Arrow, saw them nominated for the 2019 ARIA Award for Best World Music Album.

Members
Susie Bishop (violin, guitar, vocals)
Laura Altman (clarinet, vocals)
Emily-Rose Sarkova (accordion, piano, vocals)
Laura Bishop (percussion, piano, accordion, vocals)
Johan Delin (double bass, vocals)
Rendra Freestone (percussion, guitar, vocals)
Phillippa Murphy-Haste (clarinet, vocals)
Sarah Myerson (cimbalom, vocals)
Mirabai Peart (violin)

Discography

Albums
{| class="wikitable plainrowheaders" style="text-align:center;"
|-
! rowspan="2" style="width:15em;"| Title
! rowspan="2" style="width:17em;"| Details
! colspan="1"| Peak positions
|- style="font-size:smaller;"
! width="50"| AUS
|-
! scope="row"| Songs of the Vulgar Boatwomen  (as Di Khupe Heybners)
|
 Released: June 2008
 Label: 
 Formats: CD
| —
|-
! scope="row"| Chaika
|
 Released: July 2012
 Label: Chaika (Chaika 001)
 Formats: CD 
| —
|-
! scope="row"| I Monti
|
 Released: 2014
 Label: Chaika (Chaika 002)
 Formats: CD 
| —
|-
! scope="row"| Arrow'''
|
 Released: 2019
 Label: Chaika (Chaika 003)
 Formats: CD, Digital 
| —
|-
|}

Awards and nominations
ARIA Music Awards
The ARIA Music Awards is an annual awards ceremony that recognises excellence, innovation, and achievement across all genres of Australian music. They commenced in 1987.

! 
|-
| 2019
| Arrow''
| ARIA Award for Best World Music Album
| 
| 
|-

References

External links
Chaika. A new direction in Australian folk

Australian world music groups
Living people
Year of birth missing (living people)